KidsWorld is an English-language Canadian magazine aimed towards children aged twelve and under, published by MIR Communications Inc. The magazine features sections and articles such as movies, sports, hobbies, and role models. The magazine is provided free to elementary schools, and is published on a quarterly basis. The headquarters of the magazine is in Toronto, Ontario. It is available online through Gale, and covered in Canadian Periodical Index. The ISSN is 1490–6341. Kids World Magazine as it was originally titled, was first published in March 1993. The website of the magazine was launched in 1996.

References

External links
KidsWorld Online as of 2014, on the Wayback Machine
KidsWorld Magazine on Issuu

1993 establishments in Ontario
Children's magazines published in Canada
Classroom magazines
Free magazines
Magazines established in 1993
Magazines published in Toronto
Quarterly magazines published in Canada